The men's +80 kg competition in taekwondo at the 2008 Summer Olympics in Beijing took place on August 23 at the Beijing Science and Technology University Gymnasium.

Cuban competitor Ángel Valodia Matos was leading 3-2 in the bronze medal bout against Kazakhstan's Arman Chilmanov, until he apparently suffered a broken toe and was subsequently ruled to have retired after the allotted one minute of injury time expired. After a brief argument, Matos kicked referee Chakir Chelbat in the face, punched a judge in the arm and spat on the floor of the arena before he and his coach, Leudin González, who had criticized the referee's ruling as too strict and also accused Kazakhstan of bribing officials, were escorted out by security.

The World Taekwondo Federation (WTF) subsequently banned Matos and González from WTF sanctioned events for life, and ordered Matos's results from the Beijing Games to be deleted from the records. As Chelbat received a cut lip that required seven stitches, the WTF also considered taking legal action against the Cuban team.

Competition format
The main bracket consisted of a single elimination tournament, culminating in the gold medal match. Two bronze medals were awarded at the taekwondo competitions. A repechage was used to determine the bronze medal winners. Every competitor who lost to one of the two finalists competed in the repechage, another single-elimination competition. Each semifinal loser faced the last remaining repechage competitor from the opposite half of the bracket in a bronze medal match.

Schedule
All times are China standard time (UTC+8)

Qualifying Athletes

Results
Legend
PTG — Won by points gap
SUP — Won by superiority
OT — Won on over time (Golden Point)

Main bracket

Repechage

References

Taekwondo at the 2008 Summer Olympics
Men's events at the 2008 Summer Olympics